Johnny (also spelled Johnnie) is a given name.

Johnny or Johnnie may also refer to:

Films
 Johnny (1980 film), an Indian Tamil language film
 Johnny (1983 film), a 1983 film by Arun Roy
 Johny (film), a 1993 Indian Malayalam language film
 Johnny (1999 film), a Canadian film directed by Carl Bessai
 Johnny (2003 film), an Indian Telugu language film
 Johnny (2018 film), an Indian Tamil language film

Music

People
 Johnnie Wright of Johnnie & Jack, an American country music duo active in the mid-20th century

Albums
 Johnny (John Farnham album), 1971
 Johnny (Johnny Mathis album), 1963
Johnny, a 2019 album by Johnny Hallyday

Songs
 "Johnny" (Salmonella Dub song)
 "Johnny" (Suicide song), 1977
 "Johnny" (Yemi Alade song), 2014
 "Johnny", a song by System of a Down featured in the special edition of Toxicity
 "Johnny", a cover by Vaya Con Dios of Romanian song Sanie cu zurgălăi
 "Johnny", a song by Brockhampton from Saturation III
 "Johnny", a song by Falz from the album Moral Instruction
 "Johnny", a song by Thin Lizzy from the album Johnny the Fox

Other uses
 Johnnie, a 1944 novel by Dorothy B. Hughes
 Johnnie, Nevada, a ghost town

See also
Johnnies (disambiguation)
 Johnny gown, hospital gown
 Johnny Reb, a slang term for Southern Confederates during the American Civil War
 Johnnycake, a cornmeal flatbread
 Onion Johnny, a Breton farmer or agricultural labourers who sells onions door-to-door in the UK